Dorcadion macedonicum is a species of beetle in the family Cerambycidae. It was described by Jurecek in 1929. It is known from Albania and North Macedonia.

References

macedonicum
Beetles described in 1929